Patricia Bahia is an American singer, songwriter, and musician.  Her songs have aired on TV shows, The Fosters (American TV series), Nashville (2012 TV series), Pretty Little Liars: The Perfectionists, and Riverdale (2017 TV series), among others.  In 2015, she was nominated for two L.A. Music Critic Awards: Best Pop Rock Artist (Female) and Best CD (Female).  Bahia is an ovarian cancer survivor. Her songs, Every Day is a Gift, Great Day to Be Alive, and Keep the Light On, inspired in part by her cancer experience, have garnered two Positive Music Awards, the West Coast Songwriters International Song Contest's Grand Prize, and a Peace Song Award.

Bahia is a solo singer-songwriter and also writes, performs, and records with the musical duo, 7th & Hope.

Early life and education
Patricia Bahia was born in St. Louis, Missouri to parents Maarten and Farah Nieuwenhuizen. Her father, a retired psychiatrist, is Dutch, and her mother, a retired art educator, is Persian.

As a child, Bahia sang in choirs, took dance, piano, and voice lessons, and played the clarinet. Her first public performance was a dance recital at age six on the paddle boat, the SS Admiral (1907), on the Mississippi river in St. Louis, Missouri.

She attended the Plan II Honors Program at The University of Texas at Austin, graduating Phi Beta Kappa. Her thesis was on the Women's Suffrage Movement for which she traveled to locate diaries and letters from Suffragettes. She attended the University of California, Hastings College of the Law in San Francisco. It was in law school that Bahia began singing again.

She worked for a number of years as an attorney, moonlighting as a jazz singer with a residency at Café Claude in San Francisco.

Music career
Bahia is a founding member of the Oakland Interfaith Gospel Choir, with which she toured internationally and sang backing vocals on Linda Ronstadt's, Cry Like a Rainstorm, Howl Like the Wind album. She performed with the Choir until 2006.

In 2003, Bahia was diagnosed with ovarian cancer and decided to begin writing songs. She left her legal career and began studying the craft of songwriting.  She started playing the piano again, learned to play the guitar, and began performing as a solo singer-songwriter. In 2010 she released an EP titled, Long Road Home and in 2015 she released a full-length album, Save Your Heart which received favorable reviews.

Teaching and vocal coaching
Bahia coaches clients on vocal technique, performance, songwriting, and music licensing. Previously, she taught voice at the University of Southern California (USC) and voice and music business at the California State University, Los Angeles (CSULA). 

Bahia holds an MM (Master of Music) degree in Commercial Music from the California State University, Los Angeles.

Songs in film and television

Awards
In 2020 Bahia won a total of three Peace Song Awards including the grand prize award. In 2020 Bahia won two Positive Music Awards also known as "Posi" awards.
{| class="wikitable sortable"
!Year
!Nominated Work
!Category
!Result
|-
| 2020 || Every Heart One Love || Positive Music Award ||  
|-
| 2020 || (Say Yes) World With A Little More Love || Positive Music Award ||  
|-
| 2020 || Grand Prize Winner || Peace Song Award ||  
|-
| 2020 || Every Heart One Love - Rock & Pop || Peace Song Award ||  
|-
| 2020 || (Say Yes) World With A Little More Love - World Music  || Peace Song Award ||  
|-
| 2019 || Keep The Light On || Peace Song Award ||  
|-
| 2019 || Keep The Light On || Positive Music Award ||  
|-
| 2019 || Everything's Gonna Be Alright || Positive Music Award ||  
|-
| 2018 || Great Day To Be Alive || West Coast Songwriters Int'l Song Contest Grand Prize ||  
|-
| 2018 || Every Day Is a Gift || Positive Music Award ||  
|-
| 2017 || Good Day || Positive Music Award ||  
|-
| 2017 || Why We Walk || Positive Music Award ||  
|-
| 2015 || Save Your Heart || L.A. Music Critic Award – Best CD ||  
|- 
| 2015 || Patricia Bahia || L.A. Music Critic Award – Best Artist ||  

In 2020, Bahia's songs Every Heart One Love and It’s All Good, were finalists in the John Lennon Songwriting Contest. In 2022, Bahia's song, It's All Good, was a finalist in the International Acoustic Music Awards.

References

External links

Living people
American women pop singers
American women singer-songwriters
21st-century American composers
American women composers
Year of birth missing (living people)
21st-century American women singers